The discography of American country music singer–songwriter Lainey Wilson contains three studio albums, three extended plays (EPs), three music videos, eight singles, six promotional singles and has appeared on two additional albums. While still in high school, Wilson self-released an EP of songs on her Myspace account called Country Girls Rule. In 2014, her self-titled studio album was issued on the Culpit label and was later followed in 2016 by her second studio offering Tougher. The latter disc was her first to make the Billboard Top Country Albums list. 

In 2018, she self-released a second EP. After signing a recording contract with the BBR Music Group, the label issued her third EP titled Redneck Hollywood (2019). Her debut single with the label was also released in 2019 called "Dirty Looks". In 2020, Wilson's second BBR single was issued titled "Things a Man Oughta Know". The release became her breakout single, topping the Billboard Country Airplay chart and reaching the top five of the Hot Country Songs. In 2021, her third studio album was issued called Sayin' What I'm Thinkin'. The disc was her second to chart on the Country Albums list.

Studio albums

Extended plays

Singles

As lead artist

As a featured artist

Promotional singles

Music videos

Other album appearances

Notes

References

Discographies of American artists
Country music discographies